As of the 2000 Census, over half of the 37,279 people of Japanese ancestry in the U.S. state of New York lived in New York City. As of 2012, the New York City metropolitan area was home to the largest Japanese community on the East Coast of the United States.

History
In 1876, six Japanese businessmen arrived in New York City on the Oceanic and established companies. They were the first Japanese people in the state of New York. Almost all of the 1,000 Issei in New York State by 1900 were in New York City. The Chinese Exclusion Acts of 1882 restricted Japanese immigration to the United States and the United States and Japanese governments had a gentlemen's agreement where the Japanese would deny visas to laborers wishing to immigrate to the United States in exchange for the U.S. not officially ending Japanese immigration. For those reasons, before the 1950s New York City had few Japanese immigrants. Japanese individuals of higher socioeconomic backgrounds did enter New York City during that period. Until the 1960s there was never a greater number than 5,000 Japanese people in New York State.

The National Origins Act of 1924 officially barred Japanese immigration into the United States. By the 1920s, Issei with high socioeconomic status had moved to Long Island and to New Rochelle and Scarsdale in Westchester County.

After the attack on Pearl Harbor in 1941 the Japanese consulate in New York City closed. Several Japanese businesses closed as well. The overall New York State Japanese population was not mass-interned. Issei community leaders were interned at Ellis Island. After the internment of Japanese Americans ended, New York's Japanese community accepted the arrivals who had formerly been interned.

Japanese officials connected with the United Nations arrived in the 1950s and businesspeople associated with Japanese companies began arriving in the late 1950s. Japanese immigrants became the main presence of Japanese communities after the passage of the Immigration and Nationality Act of 1965. By 1988 there were 50,000 Japanese businesspersons working in Greater New York City, with 77% of them being temporary employees with plans to return to Japan. At that time employees of Japanese companies and their families were over 80% of the Japanese residents of the New York City area. About 25% of Japanese residents in the New York City metropolitan area had considered and/or decided to stay in the United States permanently.

Commerce

In March 2011, Sam Dolnick and Kirk Semple of The New York Times wrote that the "prominent outpost of Japanese culture" in New York City was a group of sake bars and sushi restaurants in the East Village neighborhood of Manhattan. In December 2014, Pete Wells of The Times heralded the clusters of Japanese restaurants in the East Village and on the east side of Midtown Manhattan for their variety of dishes and the excellence of their food; this latter neighborhood in Midtown East also houses the Japan Society and the Consulate-General of Japan in New York City, as well as Japanese cafes, markets, and corporate offices, although it is not formally recognized as a Japantown.

As of 2002, there were 2,528 Japanese citizens employed by 273 companies in the states of New York, New Jersey, and Connecticut.

The Japanese Chamber of Commerce and Industry of New York stated that in 1992 357 companies had operations in Greater New York City and these companies employed 6,048 Japanese nationals living in Greater New York City. The Japanese consulate in New York City stated that in 1992 there were about 16,000 Japanese people living in Westchester County, New York, and about 25-33% of the expatriates employed by the Japanese companies in the New York City area lived in Westchester County. Up to a few years before 2002, Japanese companies gave benefits to their staffs, and the annual supporting costs of a mid-level employee were about $50,000. The companies provided cars with full-time chauffeurs for senior staff and paid for golf club membership, magazine subscriptions, tuition for schools, and housing expenses for all employees.

By 2002 the Japanese presence in Westchester County decreased since many Japanese companies reduced or eliminated overseas departments due to the recession in Japan. Japanese companies also eliminated many benefits for their overseas staff. The population of Japanese citizens employed by the companies decreased 58% from 1992 to 2002.

Geographic distribution
As of 2007, there were 51,705 Japanese persons living in the New York metropolitan area. Westchester County, New York and Bergen County, New Jersey were popular points of settlement.

As of 1988, ethnic Japanese often settled certain suburban residential communities before ethnic Koreans started settling the same areas. In that decade Queens was the most popular point of Japanese permanent settlement, while wealthy temporary resident Japanese businesspersons preferred Westchester County, and in general ethnic Japanese lived around Japanese communities throughout the New York City area.

Queens and Manhattan
As of 2011, within New York City itself the largest groups of Japanese residents was in Astoria, Queens and Yorkville on the Upper East Side of Manhattan. As of the 2010 U.S. Census there are about 1,300 Japanese in Astoria and about 1,100 Japanese in Yorkville. 500 Japanese people lived in East Village. As of that year, most short-term Japanese business executives in Greater New York City resided in Midtown Manhattan or in New York City suburbs.

In 2011, The New York Times wrote that while other ethnic groups in the New York City region clustered in specific areas, the Japanese were distributed "thinly" and "without a focal point," unlike the manner in which Manhattan's Chinatown served the city's Chinese populace. They stated that the relatively low number of Japanese in the city and area contributed to the lack of a focal point: there were about 20,000 Japanese in New York City compared to 305,000 Chinese. Clusters of Japanese restaurants and other businesses have been established in the East Village and in Midtown East; and since 2010, numerous Japanese restaurants have also emerged in Manhattan's Koreatown, centered on West 32nd Street between 5th and 6th Avenues. Japanese restaurants have attained significant prominence in New York City; thirteen Japanese restaurants in Manhattan earned Michelin stars in 2014.

Bergen County, New Jersey
As of 2011, the Japanese population in Bergen County, New Jersey, had rebounded to approximately 6,000 individuals. Dolnick and Semple of The New York Times also wrote in 2011 that Japanese supermarkets such as the Mitsuwa Marketplace in Edgewater, New Jersey, the largest Japanese-oriented shopping center on the U.S. East Coast, are "the closest thing to hubs" of Japanese influence in Greater New York City. The Japanese-American Society of New Jersey is based in Fort Lee.

In 1987 there were 1,800 Japanese national children the North Jersey region.

Westchester County, New York
As of 2000, Japanese expatriates in Westchester County, New York, living mostly in Scarsdale, and according to The New York Times, it was well known in Japan as a place with good housing stock and schools. As of 2000, some Japanese also lived in Eastchester, Harrison, Hartsdale, and Rye.

Due to the declining Japanese economy, by 2000 the Japanese presence in Westchester County had decreased, and as of 2002, the declining presence led to closures of businesses and the end of some activities. However, according to the 2009-2013 American Community Survey, the number of Japanese had increased back to approximately 5,000 in Westchester County.

Demographics
As of 2011, there were about 20,000 Japanese in New York City and a total of 45,000 in the Greater New York City area. Many of the Japanese are from transient groups such as university students, artists, and business workers. Many expatriate business executives and workers are posted to the United States for three to five year terms. As of 2011 65% of the Japanese in New York City have bachelor's degrees and the median income for Japanese over the age of 25 is $60,000. This is $10,000 above the citywide median income.

Institutions

In 2011, Sam Dolnick and Kirk Semple of The New York Times wrote that few Japanese organizations in New York City have "broad-based constituencies" and those that exist tend to promote Japanese arts and assist elderly populations. They added that among the Japanese community there are "few" civic or religious leaders with prominence.

In 1901, the Japanese Methodist Church opened in New York City. In 1905, the social organization Nippon Club opened. In 1907 the Japan Society, an artistic foundation, opened. The Japan Society was an interracial organization. In 1930, the leaders of the Japanese Association sponsored the Tozei Club, an all-Nisei organization. The Nippon Club was seized after the 1941 attack on Pearl Harbor. The property was sold.

The Japanese American Association of New York (JAA, ニューヨーク日系人会 Nyūyōku Nikkeijin Kai) is in operation. There is a Consulate-General of Japan in New York City located on the 18th Floor of 299 Park Avenue in Midtown Manhattan. The Japanese American Committee for Democracy was active during WWII.

The Noguchi Museum is located in Long Island City, Queens.

Media
The Shukan NY Seikatsu (週刊NY生活), published by the New York Seikatsu Press, is a weekly Japanese-language newspaper in the New York City area. It was founded in January 2004. The paper is headquartered in Midtown Manhattan.

From 1901 to 1925, the Japanese American Commercial Weekly (日米週報 Nichi-Bei Shūhō) was published and served as the community's newspaper. The Japanese name of the paper after 1918 became the 日米時報 Nichi-Bei Jihō.

The Japanese American (日米時報 Nichi-Bei Jihō) was published from 1924 to 1941. In 1931 the Japanese American began an English section. In 1939 the English section became its own newspaper, the Japanese American Review.

Anime set in New York City
This List contains the anime and manga the city of New York has been based on Japanese culture.

Baccano! (2008)
Banana Fish (2018)
Cowboy Bebop (1998-1999)
Estab Life (2022)
Eden of the East (2009)

Education
The Japanese Educational Institute of New York (JEI; ニューヨーク日本人教育審議会 Nyūyōku Nihonjin Kyōiku Shingi Kai), a nonprofit organization that receives funding from corporate donations and Japanese government subsidies, operates educational programs for Japanese people living in the New York City area. First established in 1975, the foundation, headquartered in Rye, operates two Japanese day schools and two weekend school systems in the New York City area.

Primary and secondary schools

Two Japanese international day schools serving elementary and junior high school levels, the Japanese School of New York in Greenwich, Connecticut and the New Jersey Japanese School in Oakland, New Jersey serve the Greater New York City area. Prior to 1991, the Japanese School of New York was in New York City. The New Jersey school opened in 1992 as a branch campus of the New York school and became its own school in 1999. The Keio Academy of New York, a Japanese boarding high school, is located in Harrison, New York.

In 1983, the majority of Japanese national students within Greater New York City attended U.S. schools. To have education in the Japanese language and Japanese literature, they attend the weekend classes offered by the Japanese Weekend School of New York. The parents who select the weekend school and local school combination often wish to raise their children as international and connected to foreign cultures, while parents choosing the Japanese day schools wish to raise them as typical Japanese children. As of 1988 over 30% of the New York City area parents of school age children selected the full-time NYJS instead of the weekend school and local school combination.

By 1991 Lyceum Kennedy, a French-American private school, had established a program for Japanese students.

An influx of Japanese businesspersons into Scarsdale caused the Asian population of Scarsdale High School to increase from 5% around 1986 to almost 20% in 1991. That year 19.3% of the students in the Scarsdale Public Schools were Japanese.

Miscellaneous education
There are three supplementary Japanese school systems in the New York City area. Two of them, the weekend schools of New York and New Jersey, are operated by the JEI.

The Japanese Weekend School of New York has its offices in New Roc City in New Rochelle, New York. As of 2006 the school had about 800 students, including Japanese citizens, and Japanese Americans, at locations in Westchester County and Long Island. The class locations include The Rufus King School (P.S.26Q) in Fresh Meadows, Queens, and Port Chester Middle School in Port Chester, New York.

The Japanese Weekend School of New Jersey (ニュージャージー補習授業校 Nyūjājī Hoshū Jugyō Kō) holds its classes at Paramus Catholic High School in Paramus, New Jersey while its offices are in Fort Lee, New Jersey. The school previously used parents as teachers, with them acting in a volunteer capacity, but by 1994 it switched to using paid teachers and collected tuition from parents, about $1,000 every four months. In the 1990s its classes were held at different campuses: C, H, J, and N. N only held elementary classes while J held only secondary classes. The first, second, and fourth campuses were in Clifton, Hackensack, and Fort Lee, respectively. By 1994, due to a decline in the Japanese economy, the weekend school was not getting as many students as it used to.

The Princeton Community Japanese Language School (PCJLS) also serves Japanese residents living in the New York City area. It is not affiliated with the JEI.

In 1987 there were five juku (cram schools) in Bergen County, New Jersey, with two of them in Fort Lee. One of the Fort Lee schools, Hinoki School, had 130 students.

Religion

The , catering to the Princeton, New Jersey area Japanese community, is in nearby Monmouth Junction, South Brunswick. It was established in October 1991, and in 1993 had 20-25 attendees per Sunday church worship.

Notable individuals

Japanese-Americans include:
 Akiko Ichikawa, Issei artist and editor
 Takuma Kajiwara (1876-1960), Issei photographer
 Yuri Kochiyama
 Isamu Noguchi, Nisei sculptor
 Miné Okubo (1912 – 2001), Nisei graphic novelist
 Sono Osato (1919 – 2018), Nisei entertainer
 Hikaru Utada, Nisei singer
 Michi Weglyn (1926 – 1999), Nisei author and civil rights activist

Japanese nationals and immigrants include:
 Sadakichi Hartmann (1867 – 1944), American art and photography critic
 Ayako Ishigaki (pen name Haru Matsui), activist
 Eitaro Ishigaki, among 100 Japanese artists working in NYC between World War I and World War II
 Joji, singer
 Yasuo Kuniyoshi, among 100 Japanese artists working in NYC between World War I and World War II
 Hideyo Noguchi (1876 – 1928), Japanese bacteriologist
 Yone Noguchi (1875 – 1947), writer and father of Isamu Noguchi
 Jōkichi Takamine (1854 – 1922), Japanese chemist
 Taro and Mitsu Yashima, among 100 Japanese artists working in NYC between World War I and World War II)

In 2011, the New American Leaders Project stated that it was not aware of any first or second generation Japanese immigrant in a citywide office in New York City or a statewide New York office.

See also

 Asian Americans in New York City
 Bangladeshis in New York City
 Chinese people in New York City
 Demographics of New York City
 Filipinos in the New York metropolitan area
 Fuzhounese in New York City
 Indians in the New York City metropolitan region
 Koreans in New York City
 Russians in New York City
 Taiwanese people in New York City

References
  Kunieda, Mari (國枝 マリ; School of International Cultural Relations). "Assimilation to American Life vs.Maintenance of Mother Culture : Japanese and Korean Children in New York" (Archive; Japanese title: 異文化接触と母国文化 : 在ニューヨーク日本人・韓国人子女の場合). Hokkaido Tokai University Bulletin (北海道東海大学紀要): Humanities and social sciences (人文社会科学系) 1, 131–147, 1988. Hokkaido Tokai University. See profile at CiNii. Abstract in Japanese available.

Reference notes

Further reading
 Hosler, Akiko S. Japanese Immigrant Entrepreneurs in New York City: A New Wave of Ethnic Business. Garland Publishing (New York City), 1998.
 Sawada, Mitziko. Tokyo Dreams, New York Nights: Urban Japanese Visions of America, 1890-1924. University of California Press (Berkeley, California) 1996.
  Uranishi, Kazuhiko (浦西 和彦 Uranishi Kazuhiko). "前田河広一朗と 「日米時報」" (Archive). 関西大学国文学会. 31 January 2002. Posted at Kansai University.

External links
 
  
 
 

Asian-American culture in New York City
 
Ethnic groups in New York City
New York City